Vincent Montmeát (born ) is a former French male volleyball player. He was part of the France men's national volleyball team. He competed with the national team at the 2004 Summer Olympics in Athens, Greece. He played with Stade Poitevin Poitiers in 2004.

Clubs
  Stade Poitevin Poitiers (2004)

See also
 France at the 2004 Summer Olympics

References

1977 births
Living people
French men's volleyball players
Place of birth missing (living people)
Volleyball players at the 2004 Summer Olympics
Olympic volleyball players of France